Bronswell Dante Patrick (born September 16, 1970) is a former baseball relief pitcher. He played in parts of two seasons in Major League Baseball (MLB) and appeared in several international leagues.

Playing career
Patrick attended D. H. Conley High School in Winterville, North Carolina where he played baseball, basketball and football. He had scholarship offers to play both football and baseball at NC State University but chose instead to sign with the Oakland Athletics after they selected him in the 23rd round of the 1988 MLB draft with the 593rd overall pick. Patrick started out with the Phoenix Athletics in the Arizona League and pitched in Oakland's system until , when he left as a minor league free agent.

Patrick had agreed to play as a "replacement player" in the wake of the 1994 baseball strike, but his MLB debut was postponed when the two sides struck a deal. Until his Major League debut in 1998, he spent ten years languishing in the Oakland, Houston and Milwaukee farm systems. Upon signing with the Brewers before the 1998 season, he told his wife that we would retire if he did not make the Majors that year.

On May 11, 1998, the Brewers placed Chad Fox on the disabled list and promoted Patrick from Triple-A Louisville. On May 18, 1998, he made his Major League debut as a reliever for the Brewers. He spent much of that season with the Brewers, pitching 78 innings while appearing mostly in relief. He collected four wins and one loss, struck out 49 batters, and posted a 4.69 earned run average. In a September 13 game against the Chicago Cubs, Patrick surrendered a home run to Sammy Sosa, during Sosa's chase of the record for the single-season home run record. The home run in question was Sosa's 61st of the season, tying the previous mark set by Yankees outfielder Roger Maris, and placing him one behind McGwire, who had hit his 62nd on September 8. Later in the same game, Sosa would hit his 62nd against Eric Plunk to pull into a tie with McGwire.

After the season, the Brewers removed Patrick from their roster, and he joined the San Francisco Giants organization. Working as a starter for their AAA affiliate, the Fresno Grizzlies, Patrick set a Fresno record with 14 wins. The Giants rewarded him for his good work with a September callup, and he appeared in six games for them, picking up a win and a save despite a 10.12 ERA. His one save came on September 29, 1999 against the arch rival Dodgers. Patrick retired the final two batters of the game to preserve a 5-1 Giants victory. Patrick nailed down the win for starting pitcher Liván Hernández.

The Giants removed him from their roster after the season, but Patrick continued to pitch professionally. In 2002, he pitched in the Korea Baseball Organization for the Samsung Lions. In a 2000 interview with the Calgary Sun, Patrick was quoted as saying, "I'm going to continue to try and pitch as long as I can. Until they come and tell me they're taking the uniform away, and even then they're not getting it without a fight." 

In between, Patrick played winter ball with the Leones del Caracas and Tiburones de La Guaira clubs of the Venezuelan Professional Baseball League in three seasons spanning 1997–2005.

Coaching

In 2008, Patrick joined the staff of the AZL Padres as the team's pitching coach. He also worked in the same capacity for the Single-A Fort Wayne TinCaps of the Midwest League in the 2010 season.

Before the 2013 season, he was named pitching coach of the Tucson Padres.

In 2015, he was hired as the pitching coach of the El Paso Chihuahuas. In 2016, he was named the pitching coach for the Pacific Coast League in the Triple-A All-Star Game.

Patrick has coached for the Naranjeros de Hermosillo of the Mexican Pacific League, and was promoted to manager of the club for the 2018–19 season. In 2020, he became the Águilas de Mexicali manager.

In February 2022, Patrick joined Diablos Rojos del México of the Mexican League as pitching coach. However, he left the team prior to the start of the season, for what the club cited was due to personal reasons. Patrick later joined the Acereros de Monclova of the Mexican League on May 2, 2022, as their new pitching coach. He was not retained by the club following the season.

Personal life
Patrick married his wife, Julie, in the late 1990s while he was still a minor leaguer. Shortly after getting married, they had a son named Tavian. Tavian was recruited to play college football at Arizona State.

According to Patrick, his unusual given name was suggested by an aunt, who claimed to have seen it used overseas. He has two sons Tavain, Kilian, and one daughter Jayden.

References

External links
, or Retrosheet, or The Baseball Gauge, or Venezuela Winter League
Career statistics and player information from Korea Baseball Organization

1970 births
Living people
African-American baseball coaches
African-American baseball players
American expatriate baseball players in Canada
American expatriate baseball players in Mexico
American expatriate baseball players in South Korea
American expatriate baseball players in Taiwan
Arizona League Athletics players
Baseball players from North Carolina
Brother Elephants players
Calgary Cannons players
Diablos Rojos del México players
KBO League pitchers
Fresno Grizzlies players
Huntsville Stars players
Leones de Yucatán players
Leones del Caracas players
American expatriate baseball players in Venezuela
Louisville Redbirds players
Madison Muskies players
Major League Baseball pitchers
Major League Baseball replacement players
Mexican League baseball pitchers
Milwaukee Brewers players
Minor league baseball coaches
Modesto A's players
New Orleans Zephyrs players
Olmecas de Tabasco players
Sportspeople from Greenville, North Carolina
Samsung Lions players
San Francisco Giants players
Tacoma Tigers players
Tiburones de La Guaira players
Tucson Toros players
Cañeros de Los Mochis players
21st-century African-American sportspeople
20th-century African-American sportspeople